Um, also spelled as Uhm, Eom, Ohm or Om, is a relatively uncommon family name in Korea. It is written using the same character as the Chinese surname, Yan (嚴).  It has only one clan, the Yeongwol Eom clan, based in Yeongwol, Gangwon Province.   According to the 2015 census in South Korea, there were 144,425 people carrying the Eom surname.

History
Eom is a surname that originated from China. The founding ancestor, Eom Im-ui (hangul: 엄림의; hanja: 嚴林義), was sent to Korea by Emperor Xuanzong of Tang, during Gyeongdeok of Silla's reign. He was said to be a descendant of the Han dynasty scholar, Yan Ziling (嚴子陵), known as Eom Ja-neung in Korean (엄자능). 

A member of the Eom family, became one of the royal consorts of King Seongjong of Joseon, but was later murdered by his successor, King Yeonsangun. Another member of this family became the consort of King Gojong, becoming the mother of the last crown prince of the Korean Empire, Yi Un.

List of famous people

Um
 Um Aing-ran (born 1936), South Korean actress
 Um Hong-gil (born 1960), South Korean climber
 Um Hyo-sup (born 1966), South Korean actor
 Um Sang-hyun (born 1971), South Korean voice actor
Um Ki-joon (born 1976), South Korean actor
 Um Tae-hwa (born 1980), South Korean film director and screenwriter
 Um Da-woon (born 1985), South Korean soccer player
 Um Ji-eun (born 1987), South Korean freestyle wrestler
 Um Min-ji (born 1991), South Korean curler
 Um Cheon-ho (born 1992), South Korean short track speed skater

Uhm
 Uhm Bok-dong (1892-1951), Korean cyclist 
 Uhm Jung-hwa (born 1969), South Korean singer and actress
 Uhm Tae-woong (born 1974), South Korean actor

Eom
 Eom Par-yong (born 1931), South Korean sprinter
 Eom Yeong-seop (born 1964), South Korean cyclist 
 Eom Hyo-won (born 1986), South Korean handball player
 Eom Hye-won (born 1991), South Korean badminton player

Om
 Om Jong-ran (born 1985), North Korean football defender
 Om Yun-chol (born 1991), North Korean weightlifter

Oum
 Oum Sang-il (born 1976), South Korean mathematician

Ohm 

 Ohm Ki-young (born 1951), South Korean popular news anchor

See also
List of Korean family names

References

Korean-language surnames